Age van der Zee (11 November 1903 – 30 October 1982) was a Dutch athlete. He competed in the men's pole vault at the 1928 Summer Olympics, placing 14th with a height of 3.30 metres.

His personal best pole vault height was 3.90 metres, achieved in 1934.

References

External links
 

1903 births
1982 deaths
Athletes (track and field) at the 1928 Summer Olympics
Dutch male pole vaulters
Olympic athletes of the Netherlands
People from Nijefurd
Sportspeople from Friesland